Horn Ok Pleassss is a 2009 Bollywood romantic comedy film directed by Rakesh Sarang. The film stars Muzammil Ibrahim and Nana Patekar.

Plot 

The protagonist of the film, Govinda (Nana Patekar), plays the central theme role. His own life's theme works only around love. He's a truck driver, and also a billionaire, who goes out of his way to spread and support his 'hobby' for love. Ajay (Muzammil Ibrahim) loves Sia (Rimi Sen), the twin sister of Govinda's wife Ria (also played by Rimi Sen). Govinda does not know this.
Ajay's unplanned surprise is his meeting with Govinda. And him seeking his help leads to a chain of incidents. This chain of incidents decides whether Ajay gets his lady, the Sia-Ria confusion be solved and how Govinda will be able to survive this self-created life-or-death chaos for love.

Cast 
Nana Patekar as Govinda
Rimi Sen as Ria/Sia (Double Role)
Muzammil Ibrahim as Ajay
Ali Asgar
Satish Shah
Nirmiti Sawant
Mukesh Tiwari
Vrajesh Hirjee
Kunika
Shaurya Chauhan
Rakhi Sawant in item number "Nathani Utaaro"

Music

References

External links 
 

2000s Hindi-language films
2009 romantic comedy films
Indian romantic comedy films
2009 films